Dervenakia is a small village in Corinthia, in northeastern Peloponnese (southern Greece). It is situated on the old national highway from Nafplio to Corinth. Dervenakia is part of the community of Archaia Nemea. The name is derived from the Ottoman Turkish word dervent (دربند), meaning mountain pass. 

The place is famous for the Battle of Dervenakia, fought on 26–28 July 1822 during the Greek War of Independence, where 2,300 Greek irregulars under Theodoros Kolokotronis defeated the 30,000-strong army of Ottoman general Mahmud Dramali Pasha.

Populated places in Corinthia